Made in Milan is a 1990 short documentary film about fashion designer Giorgio Armani; it shows him preparing for a show and discusses his ideas about fashion, his family history and the city of Milan. It was directed by Martin Scorsese. It was Scorsese's first short film since the 1967 The Big Shave, his first documentary since the 1978 The Last Waltz, and his first (and so far only) documentary short.

External links 

1990 films
1990s American films
1990s English-language films
1990s short documentary films
American short documentary films
Documentary films about fashion designers
Films scored by Howard Shore
Films with screenplays by Jay Cocks
Short films directed by Martin Scorsese